Mbali (Olumbali, Kimbari) is a minor Bantu language of Angola, spoken on the coast on the southern edge of the large Umbundu-speaking area and the northern end of the uninhabited Namib desert. Its classification is unclear. Arends et al. suggest it might turn out to be a Kimbundu–Umbundu mixed language, though it is nowhere near Kimbundu territory.

References

Languages of Angola